Ainsworth's salamander (Plethodon ainsworthi) is an extinct species of salamander in the family Plethodontidae. It was endemic to the United States and only known from its type series collected in Jasper County, Mississippi in 1964. Later research has cast doubt to its validity; it might be a junior synonym of Plethodon mississippi.

Description
Ainsworth's salamander is a very attenuated Plethodon with short limbs. It has 16 costal grooves, counting a Y-shaped groove in the groin as two grooves, and  four to six costal folds between adpressed limbs. Its peritoneum is not distinctively pigmented. It has 40 premaxillary/maxillary teeth, and palatine teeth in a large median patch, 12 teeth wide and 18 teeth long. Vomerine teeth are in two well-separated, arc-shaped rows, with eight to 10 teeth each. As with all Plethodon species, this one has four digits on the manus and five on the pes, a cylindrical tail without any basal constriction, and a tongue attached in the front.

In preservative, the specimens are dark blackish-brown without any noticeable pattern, and the peritoneum lacks any distinctive pigmentation.

The holotype and paratype were collected by Jackson Harold Ainsworth as Plethodon glutinosus in 1964, and described as a new species, Plethodon ainsworthi, by James Lazell in 1998. No other specimens are known, and the precise collection locality is unknown. The holotype is damaged, the paratype was damaged so strong that it is now lost. The distinctive features of this species, however, may result from long-term, improper preservation, suggesting that it is not a valid taxon.

Habitat and conservation
Its natural habitats were temperate forests and freshwater springs. Reasons for its extinction are unknown, but likely involved habitat loss. Plethodon mississippi, however, exists in the area where P. ainsworthi is believed to have been collected.

References

Plethodon
Amphibian extinctions since 1500
Extinct animals of the United States
Amphibians of the United States
Endemic fauna of Mississippi
Amphibians described in 1998
Taxonomy articles created by Polbot